"Too Late the Hero" is a song written and recorded by English rock musician John Entwistle, released as the first single from his fifth solo studio album, Too Late the Hero (1981). Entwistle's best-selling single, it peaked at No. 76 on the UK Singles Chart and at No. 101 on the Billboard Bubbling Under Hot 100. It was Entwistle's only chart placing in the UK.

In the UK the single was released as a limited-run picture disc of 500, all hand signed by Entwistle in return for a case of the finest whiskey.

Compilation appearances
The song is also found on Entwistle's compilation albums, Thunderfingers: The Best of John Entwistle (1996), Anthology (1996), and So Who's the Bass Player? The Ox Anthology (2005).

Personnel
 John Entwistle – lead vocals, bass guitar, synthesizers, tambourine, timps
 Joe Walsh – lead guitar, synthesizers
 Joe Vitale – drums, piano, flutes
 Billy Nicholls – backing vocals

Charts

References

External links

1981 songs
Songs written by John Entwistle
Atco Records singles
1981 singles